The 1978–79 Weber State Wildcats men's basketball team represented Weber State College during the 1978–79 NCAA Division I men's basketball season. Members of the Big Sky Conference, the Wildcats were led by fourth-year head coach Neil McCarthy and played their home games on campus at Dee Events Center in Ogden, Utah.

The Wildcats appeared in the first five finals of the conference tournament; this was the second of three consecutive titles.

Weber State earned the Big Sky's automatic bid to the expanded 40-team NCAA tournament, where they were seeded seventh in the Midwest region, the first time the Big Sky representative was not in the West region. The Wildcats met New Mexico State in the first round in Lawrence, Kansas; the Aggies won the previous meeting in December.  This time the Wildcats prevailed in  but were stopped two days later by second-seeded Arkansas.

Three Wildcats, all juniors, were named to the all-conference team. Guard Bruce Collins was a repeat selection, joined by forward David Johnson and center Richard Smith; both were on the previous season's second team.

Postseason results

|-
!colspan=6 style=| Big Sky tournament

|-
!colspan=6 style=| NCAA tournament

References

External links
Sports Reference – Weber State Wildcats: 1978–79 basketball season

Weber State Wildcats men's basketball seasons
Weber State
Weber State